The 3rd Golden Horse Awards took place on October 30, 1965 at Zhongshan Hall in Taipei, Taiwan.

Winners and nominees 
Winners are listed first, highlighted in boldface.

References

3rd
1965 film awards
1965 in Taiwan